Jerome "Trompie" Pretorius (born 22 March 1988) is a South African rugby union player who last played for the  in the Currie Cup and in the Rugby Challenge.

In 2013, Pretorius was included in a South Africa President's XV team that played in the 2013 IRB Tbilisi Cup and won the tournament after winning all three matches.

Pretorius was a member of the Pumas side that won the Vodacom Cup for the first time in 2015, beating  24–7 in the final. Pretorius made nine appearances during the season, scoring one try.

References

South African rugby union players
Living people
1988 births
Pumas (Currie Cup) players
Sharks (Currie Cup) players
Blue Bulls players
Rugby union centres
People from Boksburg
Afrikaner people
Rugby union players from Gauteng